Thomas van den Belt (born 18 June 2001) is a Dutch professional footballer who plays as a midfielder for PEC Zwolle.

References

External links

Ons Oranje Profile

2001 births
Living people
Dutch footballers
Netherlands youth international footballers
Association football midfielders
PEC Zwolle players
Eredivisie players